Arsenio Moreno Mendoza (8 October 1953 – 17 November 2021) was a Spanish writer, academic, and politician. He taught modern and contemporary history at Pablo de Olavide University and wrote numerous historical novels. A member of the Spanish Socialist Workers' Party of Andalusia, he served as mayor of Úbeda from 1983 to 1989.

References

1953 births
2021 deaths
Spanish Socialist Workers' Party politicians
People from Úbeda